Tadeusz Dominik (14 January 1928 – 20 May 2014) was a Polish painter, draftsman and art professor.

Dominik was born in Szymanów near Góra Kalwaria. He studied painting at the Academy of Fine Arts in Warsaw and received his degree in the painting studio of Prof. Jan Cybis in 1953. He taught at his alma mater from 1951 until his death in 2014. From 1958 until 1959 Dominik resided in Paris thanks to a French government scholarship. During the period of 1961 until 1962 he created work in the United States as the scholar of the Ford Foundation. Dominik died in Warsaw on May 20, 2014, at the age of 85.

Awards 
 1964 - Festiwal International d'art. Contemporain, Monte Carlo
 1973 - Jan Cybis Prize, Warsaw
 2010 - The Kazimierz Ostrowski Award, Gdansk

References

External links 
 Tadeusz Dominik. Painting in culture.pl 
 Tadeusz Dominik at Art Gallery Katarzyna Napiórkowska in Poland

20th-century Polish painters
20th-century Polish male artists
21st-century Polish painters
21st-century male artists
Polish draughtsmen
1928 births
2014 deaths
Academy of Fine Arts in Warsaw alumni
Polish male painters